Schneider is a town in West Creek Township, Lake County, Indiana, United States. The population was 277 at the 2010 census. It is the smallest incorporated town in Lake County by population. It sits in the Kankakee River Valley.

History
The Schneider post office opened in 1902.

Geography

Demographics

2010 census
As of the census of 2010, there were 277 people, 98 households, and 72 families living in the town. The racial makeup of the town was 97.1% White, 1.1% Native American, 1.1% Asian, and 0.7% from two or more races. Hispanic or Latino of any race were 2.5% of the population.

There were 98 households, of which 37.8% had children under the age of 18 living with them, 53.1% were married couples living together, 13.3% had a female householder with no husband present, 7.1% had a male householder with no wife present, and 26.5% were non-families. 24.5% of all households were made up of individuals, and 6.1% had someone living alone who was 65 years of age or older. The average household size was 2.83 and the average family size was 3.26.

The median age in the town was 33.5 years. 29.6% of residents were under the age of 18; 7.7% were between the ages of 18 and 24; 27.4% were from 25 to 44; 25.3% were from 45 to 64; and 10.1% were 65 years of age or older. The gender makeup of the town was 51.6% male and 48.4% female.

2000 census
As of the census of 2000, there were 317 people, 113 households, and 84 families living in the town. The racial makeup of the town was 98.11% White, 0.32% African American, 0.32% Native American, 0.32% Pacific Islander, and 0.95% from two or more races. 0.63% of the population was Hispanic or Latino of any race.

There were 113 households, out of which 38.9% had children under the age of 18 living with them, 57.5% were married couples living together, 10.6% had a female householder with no husband present, and 24.8% were non-families. 20.4% of all households were made up of individuals, and 9.7% had someone living alone who was 65 years of age or older. The average household size was 2.79, and the average family size was 3.21.

In the town, the population was spread out, with 30.0% under the age of 18, 9.8% from 18 to 24, 28.4% from 25 to 44, 19.2% from 45 to 64, and 12.6% who were 65 years of age or older. The median age was 33 years. For every 100 females, there were 104.5 males. For every 100 females age 18 and over, there were 103.7 males.

The median income for a household in the town was $46,339, and the median income for a family was $46,932. Males had a median income of $41,250, versus $23,125 for females. The per capita income for the town was $16,463. 5.9% of the population and 4.3% of families were below the poverty line. Out of the total population, 4.9% of those under the age of 18 and 5.7% of those 65 and older were living below the poverty line.

Education
Schneider is served by the Tri-Creek School Corporation which includes Lowell High School.

References 

Towns in Lake County, Indiana
Towns in Indiana